Yongjia or Yung-chia may refer to:

 The former name for Wenzhou, a city in Zhejiang, China.  Earliest usage of Wenzhou name began in about 760 AD;  Yongjia name usage has continued.
 Yongjia County, in Zhejiang, China
 Yongjia School, Chinese school of thought during the Song Dynasty
 Yongjia Xuanjue, a Zen monk during the Tang Dynasty
 Yongjia (brachiopod), a brachiopod genus.
 Disaster of Yongjia (Chinese: 永嘉之乱) referred to events that occurred in 311 CE, when Wu Hu forces captured and sacked Luoyang, the Jin capital